Ali Mohammed Jasimi (born April 19, 1991) is a Qatari professional footballer who plays as a midfielder for Qatari club Al-Sailiya. He is mostly known for his passing style of play, especially his crosses, which he uses to provide width for his respective team. He is seen as one of the best passers in the league.

Playing career
Jasimi made his professional debut with Al Rayyan on 11 March 2012 in a 5–1 win against Al-Gharafa, replacing Mosaab Mahmoud Al Hassan after 83 minutes. This would be his only appearance with the team, although Al Rayyan won the 2012 Qatar Crown Prince Cup with Jasimi on the bench. He signed with Al-Arabi in late 2012, making his debut in September. He made 10 appearances during the 2012–13 league campaign and playoffs.

Jasimi later signed with Al Ahli in June 2013. He made his debut with the team in a 2–2 draw against Al Gharafa on 8 October 2013. He played the full 90 minutes during the Qatari Stars Cup match. He went on to make 43 league and cup appearances over the next two seasons.

Jasimi returned to Al-Arabi in June 2015.

Honours

Club
Al Rayyan
Crown Prince Cup: 2012

Al Arabi
Qatari Stars Cup: Runner-up 2012–13

Al-Sailiya SC
Qatari Stars Cup: 2021-22

References

External links
 
 SoccerPunter profile

1991 births
Living people
Qatari footballers
Al-Rayyan SC players
Al-Arabi SC (Qatar) players
Al Ahli SC (Doha) players
Qatar SC players
Al-Duhail SC players
Al-Sailiya SC players
Qatar Stars League players
Association football midfielders
Place of birth missing (living people)